Lu Hao may refer to:

Lu Hao (born 1947), Chinese politician, former governor of Gansu
Lu Hao (born 1967), Chinese politician, Minister of Natural Resources and former governor of Heilongjiang
Lu Hao (tennis) (born 1984), Chinese tennis player